= Roshanabad railway station =

Railway station in Pakistan

Coordinates: 24°54′N 69°20′E

General information
- Owner: Ministry of Railways

Other information
- Station code: RSB

History
- Former names: Great Indian Peninsula Railway
Location

Roshanabad railway station (Urdu: روشن آباد ریلوے اسٹیشن) is located in Pakistan.

== See also ==
- List of railway stations in Pakistan
- Pakistan Railways
